El Toro (Spanish for the bull) is 3,526 feet (1,075 m) high and is the highest peak in the Sierra de Luquillo mountains in eastern Puerto Rico.

The peak is located in the boundaries of barrios El Río, Las Piedras and Guzmán Arriba, Río Grande on a massif that is the source of various important rivers in the region such as Cubuy and Gurabo. It gives its name to El Toro Wilderness, which was established in the 1930s to protect the area and designated a National Wilderness Area in 2005. It is the only tropical wilderness in the U.S. National Forest System (NFS).

Despite being located in one of the most remote areas of El Yunque National Forest, this summit can be accessed from a trail from Cubuy in the municipality of Canóvanas.

References 

Mountains of the Caribbean
Mountains of Puerto Rico
Las Piedras, Puerto Rico
Río Grande, Puerto Rico
Geography of Puerto Rico